Starmerella is a genus of fungi within the Saccharomycetales order. The relationship of this taxon to other taxa within the order is unknown (incertae sedis), and it has not yet been placed with certainty into any family. Although, the GBIF list the family as Phaffomycetaceae.
Several members of the Starmerella clade are associated with flowers and flower-visiting insects like bees and bumblebees; these yeasts cope well with high sugar niches. Many strains (species) of the Starmerella clade, including Starmerella bombicola and Candida apicola are known to produce sophorolipids which are carbohydrate-based, amphiphilic biosurfactants.

The genus was circumscribed by Carlos Augusto Rosa and Marc-André Lachance in Int. J. Syst. Bacteriol. vol.48 (4) on page 1413 in 1998.

The genus name of Starmerella is in honour of William Thomas Starmer (b.1944), an American botanist and emeritus professor of biology in the  College of Arts and Sciences at Syracuse University.

Species
As accepted by Species Fungorum;
 Starmerella aceti 
 Starmerella anomalae 
 Starmerella apicola 
 Starmerella apis 
 Starmerella asiatica 
 Starmerella bacillaris 
 Starmerella batistae 
 Starmerella bombi 
 Starmerella bombicola 
 Starmerella camargoi 
 Starmerella cellae 
 Starmerella davenportii 
 Starmerella etchellsii 
 Starmerella floricola 
 Starmerella floris 
 Starmerella geochares 
 Starmerella gropengiesseri 
 Starmerella henanensis 
 Starmerella ilheusensis 
 Starmerella khaoyaiensis 
 Starmerella kuoi 
 Starmerella lactis-condensi 
 Starmerella litoralis 
 Starmerella magnoliae 
 Starmerella meliponinorum 
 Starmerella neotropicalis 
 Starmerella opuntiae 
 Starmerella potacharoeniae 
 Starmerella riodocensis 
 Starmerella roubikii 
 Starmerella scarabaei 
 Starmerella sirachaensis 
 Starmerella sorbosivorans 
 Starmerella stellata 
 Starmerella vaccinii 
 Starmerella vitae

References

External links 
 Starmerella at Index Fungorum

Saccharomycetes